The MediNotes Corporation was a private, independent software vendor (ISV) based in West Des Moines, Iowa. They manufactured and published, maintained, and supported an Electronic Medical Records solution called MediNotes e. MediNotes was featured in Inc. Magazine as part of the Inc. 500 list in 2005 and 2006, and as part of the Inc. 5000 list in 2007.

History

Founded by Scott Leum, a podiatric physician, and Donald Schoen in February 1996, MediNotes originally developed and sold a package called PodNotes, a product marketed primarily at the Podiatry discipline. Eventually the product spread to other disciplines and the name was changed to Charting Plus. Leum would leave MediNotes in 2000 to pursue other interests. A few years later, about 2007, Charting Plus was renamed MediNotes e. Don Schoen previously owned and operated another software firm prior to MediNotes called Retail Management Systems.

MediNotes gained some notoriety following Hurricane Katrina in 2005. Mobile, Alabama, podiatrist Dr. William Rogers was cited in the press as having used Charting Plus in his practice. Dr. Rogers had his entire electronic system backed up onto tapes, safeguarding the patient records, something he noted would have been difficult with paper.

In first quarter 2008, MediNotes acquired Bond Technologies, a corporation based in Tampa, Florida, renaming their EMR solution to MediNotes Clinician. This would be short-lived as later in 2008, Atlanta, GA, based Eclipsys acquired MediNotes for $45 million.  MediNotes Clinician was renamed PeakPractice. Allscripts then acquired Eclipsys and announced the sunsetting of PeakPractice (formerly Bond Clinician) and Medinotes effective January 1, 2013 and replaced all previous MediNotes software offerings with Allscripts products.

Notes and references

See also

 Electronic medical records

External links
 MediNotes Corporation - Main company web site (The site no longer exists.)
 Eclipsys Corporation - Parent corporation web site

The MediNotes Corporation was affiliated with several organizations related to the EMR and medical industry.
 HIMMS Electronic Health Record Vendors Association
 Health Level Seven (HL7)
 ASTM International
 AAFP Partners for Patients

Software companies based in Iowa
Companies based in Iowa